Sir Harold Delf Gillies  (17 June 1882 – 10 September 1960) was a New Zealand otolaryngologist and father of modern plastic surgery.

Early life
Gillies was born in Dunedin, New Zealand, the son of Member of Parliament in Otago, Robert Gillies. He attended Wanganui Collegiate School and studied medicine at Gonville and Caius College, Cambridge, where despite a stiff elbow sustained sliding down the banisters at home as a child, he was an excellent sportsman. He was a golf blue in 1903, 1904 and 1905 and also a rowing blue, competing in the 1904 Boat Race. In 1910, he acquired a position working as an ENT specialist for Sir Milsom Rees' medical practice.

Career

World War I

Following the outbreak of World War I he joined the Royal Army Medical Corps. Initially posted to Wimereux, near Boulogne, he acted as medical minder to a French-American dentist, Valadier, who was not allowed to operate unsupervised but was attempting to develop jaw repair work. Gillies, eager after seeing Valadier experimenting with nascent skin graft techniques, then decided to leave for Paris, to meet the renowned oral surgeon Hippolyte Morestin.  He saw him remove a tumour on a patient's face, and cover it with jaw skin taken from the patient.  Gillies became enthusiastic about the work and on his return to England persuaded the army's chief surgeon, William Arbuthnot-Lane, that a facial injury ward should be established at the Cambridge Military Hospital, Aldershot.

The ward rapidly proved inadequate for the increasingly large number of patients in need of treatment, and a new hospital devoted to facial repairs was developed at Sidcup. The Queen's Hospital opened in June 1917, and with its convalescent units provided over 1,000 beds. There, Gillies and his colleagues developed many innovative plastic surgery techniques; more than 11,000 operations were performed on over 5,000 men. The hospital, later to become Queen Mary's Hospital, was at Frognal House (the birthplace and property of Thomas Townshend, Lord Sydney after whom Sydney, Australia, was named).

For his war services Gillies was knighted in the 1930 Birthday Honours. Sir William Arbuthnot Lane, 1st Baronet, commented, "Better late than never".

Private practice

Between the wars Gillies developed a substantial private practice with Rainsford Mowlem, including many famous patients, and travelled extensively, lecturing, teaching and promoting the most advanced techniques worldwide.

In 1930 Gillies invited his cousin, Archibald McIndoe, to join the practice, and also suggested he apply for a post at St Bartholomew's Hospital. This was the point at which McIndoe became committed to plastic surgery, in which he too became pre-eminent.

World War II
During World War II Gillies acted as a consultant to the Ministry of Health, the RAF and the Admiralty. He organised plastic surgery units in various parts of Britain and inspired colleagues to do the same, including pioneering plastic surgeon Stewart Harrison who founded the plastic surgery unit at Wexham Park Hospital, Berkshire. His own work continued at Rooksdown House, part of the Park Prewett Hospital, Basingstoke. During this period, and after the war, he trained many doctors from Commonwealth nations in plastic surgery.

Pioneering sex reassignment surgery
Instead of retiring at the end of the Second World War Gillies had to keep working as he had insufficient savings.

In 1946, he and a colleague carried out one of the first sex reassignment surgeries from female to male on Michael Dillon. In 1951 he and colleagues carried out one of the first modern sex reassignment surgeries, from male to female, on Roberta Cowell, using a flap technique, which became the standard for 40 years.

Gillies made a visit to New Zealand in 1956 after an absence of 51 years.

Death
Gillies suffered a slight cerebral thrombosis at the age of 78 while undertaking a major operation on the damaged leg of an 18-year-old girl on 3 August 1960.

Gillies died on 10 September 1960 at The London Clinic, at 20 Devonshire Place, Marylebone. Despite earning an estimated £30,000 per year between the First and Second World Wars he left an estate of only £21,161.

Personal life
Gillies married Kathleen Margaret Jackson on 9 November 1911, in London. They had four children. His eldest son, John Gillies, flew Spitfires with No. 92 Squadron RAF in World War II. John was shot down over France on 23 May 1940, and became a POW for the duration of the war. Harold's youngest son Michael Thomas Gillies followed his father into medicine. Actor Daniel Gillies is his descendant.

Gillies was an amateur golfer. He played in the Amateur Championship every year from 1906 to 1931 and represented England in their annual match against Scotland in 1908, 1925, 1926 and 1927. He won the 1913 St. George's Grand Challenge Cup and was runner-up in the 1914 Golf Illustrated Gold Vase, behind Harold Hilton. He won the President's Putter in 1925. His older brother Charles won the 1899 Australian Amateur.

For many years his home was at 71 Frognal, Hampstead, London. A blue plaque on the front of that house now commemorates his life and work. In Cambridge, in 2015, Gonville and Caius College built twelve houses and named the road Harold Gillies Close (CB5 8ZD) in his honour.

Selected publications
 Gillies HD. Plastic Surgery of the Face. Henry Frowde. 1920, 1983. 
 Gillies HD, Millard DR. The Principles and Art of Plastic Surgery. Butterworth. 1958.

Reviews

References

Bibliography

External links
 
 
 
 
 
 
 

1882 births
1960 deaths
Fellows of the Royal College of Surgeons
New Zealand otolaryngologists
Alumni of Gonville and Caius College, Cambridge
British plastic surgeons
People from Dunedin in health professions
Cambridge University Boat Club rowers
New Zealand male golfers
Amateur golfers
Surgeons specializing in transgender medicine
Hill-McIndoe-Gillies family
20th-century surgeons
20th-century British medical doctors
20th-century New Zealand medical doctors
Archibald McIndoe
New Zealand plastic surgeons
Royal Army Medical Corps officers
British Army personnel of World War I
Commanders Second Class of the Order of the Dannebrog
New Zealand military personnel of World War I